Archery at the 2007 Southeast Asian Games was held at Football Field 2, Suranaree University of Technology, Nakhon Ratchasima, Thailand.  The archery schedule began on December 7 to December 12.

Medal tally

Medalists

Recurve

Compound

External links
South East Asian Games Official Results
 Report

2007 Southeast Asian Games events
Archery at the Southeast Asian Games
2007 in archery
International archery competitions hosted by Thailand